Songs from the Hill/Tablet is the third album by Meredith Monk, released in 1979 through WERGO.

Track listing

Personnel 
Musicians
Andrea Goodman – piano and voice (B)
Susan Kampe – piano and voice (B)
Meredith Monk – vocals, piano (B)
Monica Solem – voice (B)
Production
Bob Bielecki – engineering (A1-A3, A5-A10)
Neal Ceppos – engineering (B), mixing
Richard Einhorn – production
Sally Levine – design
Kurt Munkacsi – engineering (A4)
Sarah Van Ouwerkerk – photography
Ed Trabanco – mixing (A1-A10)

References

External links 
 

1979 albums
Meredith Monk albums